The Swarm is a 1998 compilation album by the Wu-Tang Killa Bees. All of the rappers on the album are either affiliated with or direct members of the Wu-Tang Clan. The album was largely produced by RZA.

Track listing 

Track listing information is taken from the official liner notes and AllMusic.

Notes
 "Legacy" is wrongly credited to A.I.G. in the booklet of the album.

Personnel 

 Sherin Baday – Production Coordination, Art Direction
 J. Brand – Producer
 R. Brown – Producer
 Cappadonna – Performer
 James Cruz – Mastering
 D.B. Allah – Producer
 Mitchell Diggs – Executive Producer
 Robert Diggs – Executive Producer
 Bobby Digital – Performer
 R. Filler – Producer
 Ghostface Killah – Performer
 Arlene Godfrey – Production Coordination
 Inspectah Deck – Producer, Performer
 Killarmy – Performer
 Marotta – Engineer
 Mathematics – Producer
 M. McDonald – Producer
 Method Man – Performer
 Nolan "Dr. No" Moffitte – Engineer
 Raekwon – Performer
 RZA – Producer
 Shyheim – Performer
 Steve Sola – Engineer
 Sunz of Man – Performer
 David Walker – Producer
 The Wu Elements – Producer

References

Hip hop compilation albums
1998 compilation albums
Albums produced by RZA
Albums produced by 4th Disciple
Albums produced by Mathematics